Simon Cottee is an academic who works as a senior lecturer in criminology at the University of Kent, and is a regular contributor to The Atlantic. He previously worked at Bangor University and the University of the West Indies' Trinidad campus. He is the author of The Apostates: When Muslims Leave Islam (Hurst Publishers, 2015), which the publishers claim is "the first major study of apostasy from Islam in the Western secular context". In a review published in New Humanist, Alom Shaha wrote that the book "brings sensitivity and empathy to an intensely polarised debate". Nick Cohen, writing in The Spectator, argues that Cottee "shows how elements in the left and academia are happy to denounce Muslims who exercise their freedom to abandon their religion as 'native informers' who have gone over to the side of western imperialism". Cottee is also editor, with Thomas Cushman, of Christopher Hitchens and His Critics: Terror, Iraq, and the Left (New York University Press, 2008). Cottee's published research also includes journal articles on topics including the murder of Theo van Gogh and the motivations of terrorists. He has argued that gang culture offers a way of understanding the appeal of ISIS . Cottee also argues that the group's propaganda videos have a "pornographic quality".

Books

References

External links

University of Kent profile page

Academics of the University of Kent
Living people
British criminologists
Year of birth missing (living people)